This a listing of motorcycles of the 1940s, including those on sale, introduced, or otherwise relevant in this period.

Motorcycle 

Acme motorcycle (1939–49)
AJS 18
AJS 7R
AJS Model 16
AJS Model 20
AJS Porcupine
Ariel Red Hunter
Ariel W/NG 350
BMW R24
BMW R75
BSA A7
BSA B31
BSA Bantam
BSA M20
Dnepr M-72
Douglas Mark III
Ducati 60
Ducati 60 Sport
Ducati 65 Sport
Ducati Cucciolo
Fuji Rabbit
Harley-Davidson FL
Harley-Davidson Hummer
Harley-Davidson Servi-Car
Harley-Davidson WLA
Harley-Davidson XA
Honda D-Type
Imme R100
Indian 841
Indian Four (until 1942)
James Autocycle
James Comet
Lambretta Model B
Marman Twin
Matchless G80
Mitsubishi Silver Pigeon
Norton Dominator
Norton 16H
OEC
Sunbeam S7 and S8
Triumph Speed Twin
Triumph Tiger 100
Triumph 3HW
Type 97 motorcycle
Vincent Black Lightning
Vincent Black Shadow
Vincent Comet
Vincent Grey Flash
Vincent Rapide
Vincent Meteor
Welbike
Zündapp KS 750

Gallery

See also

Cyclecars
Ford Model T
Horse and buggy
List of motorcycle manufacturers
List of motorcycles by type of engine
List of motorcycles of the 1910s
List of motorcycles of the 1920s
List of motorcycles of the 1930s
List of motorcycles of the 1950s
 List of motorized trikes
Safety bicycle

References

Lists of motorcycles
Motorcycles introduced in the 1940s